Chehel Khaneh (also Romanized as Chehel Khāneh; also known as Chehil Khāneh, Chehl Khāni, Chel Khāneh, and Khūnīn) is a village in Varzaq Rural District, in the Central District of Faridan County, Isfahan Province, Iran. At the 2006 census, its population was 2,728, in 730 families.

References 

Populated places in Faridan County